Nasrallah Coussa (known as Nasri Franco Pasha, Franko Pascha, Nasrallah Franco Pasha) was the mutasarrif of the Mount Lebanon Mutasarrifate from 1868 until his death in 1873. He was a Melkite Greek Catholic from Aleppo in Syria.

References 

Governors of the Ottoman Empire
1873 deaths
Year of birth missing